Termenevo (Tirmän) is a rural locality (a selo) and the administrative centre of Termenevsky Selsoviet, Salavatsky District, Bashkortostan, Russia. The population was 774 as of 2010. There are 10 streets.

Geography 
Termenevo is located 55 km southeast of Maloyaz (the district's administrative centre) by road. Svoboda is the nearest rural locality.

References 

Rural localities in Salavatsky District